BlueSky Software was an American video game developer based in California. Formed in 1988, BlueSky closed in March 2001, when parent company Titus Interactive was in financial trouble. The BlueSky trademark continued to be owned by Titus Interactive until their bankruptcy in 2004.

Games

Atari 7800 
 Basketbrawl (1990)
 Mat Mania Challenge (1990)
 Mean 18 (1989)
 Motor Psycho (1990)
 Ninja Golf (1990)
 Scrapyard Dog (1990)
 Xenophobe (1989)

Atari Lynx 
 Cyberball 2072 (1991)
 NFL Football (1992)
 Ninja Gaiden (1990)

Amiga 
 Hare Raising Havoc (1991)
 PGA Tour Golf (1990)

Commodore 64 
 Arachnophobia (1991)
 Avoid the Noid (1989)

IBM PC compatibles 
 Arachnophobia (1991)
 ASSASSIN 2015 (1996)
 Goosebumps: Attack of the Mutant (1997)
 Hare Raising Havoc (1991)
 PC USA
 PC Globe (1990)
 Relativity (1998)
 Total Control Football (1996)

Master System 
 Dick Tracy (1990)
 Joe Montana Football (1990)

Game Gear 
 Ariel the Little Mermaid (1992)
 Joe Montana Football (1991)
 NFL '95 (1995)

Sega Genesis 
 Ariel the Little Mermaid (1992)
 College Football's National Championship (1994)
 College Football's National Championship II (1995)
 Desert Demolition Starring Road Runner and Wile E. Coyote (1995)
 Joe Montana Football II: Sports Talk Football (1991)
 Jurassic Park (1993)
 Jurassic Park: Rampage Edition (1994)
 NFL Sports Talk Football '93 (1992)
 NFL Football '94 Starring Joe Montana (1993)
 Shadowrun (1994)
 Starflight (1991)
 The Ren & Stimpy Show: Stimpy's Invention (1993)
 Vectorman (1995)
 Vectorman 2 (1996)
 World Series Baseball (1994)
 World Series Baseball '95 (1995)
 World Series Baseball '96 (1996)
 World Series Baseball '98 (1997)

32X 
 Spider-Man: Web of Fire (1996)
 World Series Baseball Starring Deion Sanders (1995)

PlayStation 
 Evil Zone (1999, US and Europe port)
 KazMania (1997)

Java applets 
 Destroyer (2000)
 Flam (2000)
 Hole in one (2000)
 Power Grid (2000)
 Sky Battle (2000)

Unreleased 
 Mat Mania Challenge (1989, Atari 8-bit family)
 Xenophobe (1989, Atari 8-bit family)
 Ninja Golf (1989, Atari 8-bit family)
 Klax (1992, Atari 8-bit family)
 Superman (2000, PlayStation)

See also
Titus Software

References

External links
 BlueSky Software Homepage (ARCHIVED)

Video game development companies
Video game companies established in 1988
Video game companies disestablished in 2001
Defunct video game companies of the United States
Defunct companies based in Greater Los Angeles
Companies based in Orange County, California
Video game companies based in California
Technology companies based in Greater Los Angeles
1988 establishments in California
2001 disestablishments in California